{{Infobox football club
| clubname = AGOVV
| image = Agovv logo.png
| fullname = Alleen Gezamenlijk OefenenVoert Verder
| nickname = De Blauwen (The Blues)Veluws Trots (Pride of the Veluwe)Apeldoorners| founded = 
| ground = Stadion Berg & Bos,Apeldoorn
| capacity = 3,250
| league = Tweede Klasse
| website = https://www.agovv.nl/
| pattern_la1 = 
| pattern_b1 = _thinwhitesides
| pattern_ra1 = 
| leftarm1 = 002FA7
| body1 = 002FA7
| rightarm1 = 002FA7
| shorts1 = 002FA7
| socks1 = FFFFFF
| pattern_la2 = 
| pattern_b2 = _thinbluesides
| pattern_ra2 = 
| leftarm2 = FFFFFF
| body2 = FFFFFF
| rightarm2 = FFFFFF
| shorts2 = FFFFFF
| socks2 = FFFFFF
| chairman =  Martin Maassen
| manager =   Gerrit Brouwer
}}

AGOVV is a Dutch association football club based in Apeldoorn. It was established on 25 February 1913. The club played in professional football from 1954 to 1971 and from 2003 to 2013. AGOVV's male first squad plays in 2022–23 in the Tweede Klasse.

History
Beginnings (1913–1954)
The club was founded on 25 February 1913 – by the teetotalers singing club – as AGOSV, which stood for  Apeldoornse Geheel Onthoudersvoetbalvereniging Steeds V'oorwaarts , after having experienced firsthand the drinking abuse after sports matches on Sundays. When the club joined the football association of Gelderland, the club had to change its name, because there was another club called Steeds Voorwaarts. The name was changed to AGOVV, or Apeldoornse Geheel Onthouders Voetbalvereniging, which means Apeldoorn football club for teetotalers. The meaning of the abbreviation was altered in 1921 to its current name. AGOVV became Alleen Gezamenlijk Oefenen Voert Verder  (Only Practising Together Brings Us Further)..

In 1938, AGOVV reached the final of the KNVB Cup in which they lost to VSV.

AGOVV achieved its best results in the 1941–42 and 1948–49 seasons, where they won the title in the Eerste Klasse East division and in the First Class Championship (today known as the Eredivisie), finished in third place.

Professionalism (1954–1971)
AGOVV became a professional club in 1954; the same year as professionalism in football was legalised in the Netherlands. After having played for several years with varying success in the Eerste Klasse and in the Eerste Divisie from 1956–57, the Royal Dutch Football Association (KNVB) formed a football pyramid with three divisions from 1962: the second-tier Eerste Divisie and the third-tier Tweede Divisie and above that the Eredivisie; the premier division in Dutch football. AGOVV mostly spent its existence in the lower regions of these tiers and were removed from professional football in 1971. The most famous players from the period of professional football were goalkeeper Joop Niezen, who later became editor-in-chief of Voetbal International, and centre-forward Sietze de Vries.

Return to amateurism (1971–2003)

In 1971, the club was removed from professional football by the KNVB by the dissolution of the Tweede Divisie. This led to protests among the citizens of Apeldoorn. The club then played in amateur competitions of the KNVB. Since then, De Blauwen for many years advocated a return to the professional divisions of the KNVB. Incidentally, a uniform strategy for achieving this only started in earnest in the mid-eighties, when a policy plan was presented that initially had to ensure AGOVV's return to the top of amateur football. This eventually yielded results: in the late nineties, the club returned to the upper echelon of amateurism and focused on professional football.

In the 2001–02 season, AGOVV became champion in the Hoofdklasse C under the leadership of manager Peter Bosz and later also won the general amateur championship of the Netherlands. In 2003, AGOVV rejoined professional football and on 1 July 2003 the club began using the name AGOVV Apeldoorn for the professional section. AGOVV Apeldoorn played in the second-tier Eerste Divisie of professional football in the Netherlands in the 2003–04 season.

Second period of professionalism (2003–2013)
Upon returning to professional football, in the 2003–04 season, former international Jurrie Koolhof was appointed as the club's head coach. He succeeded Stanley Menzo, who did not have the necessary coaching diploma. That season, forward Klaas-Jan Huntelaar became top goalscorer of the Eerste Divisie with 26 goals. After two seasons with average success and without having made it to promotion play-offs, management sought a new approach and Koolhof's contract was not extended. Menzo was now in possession of the diploma and was appointed head coach for the 2005–06 season. AGOVV won the post-competition with Menzo for the first time, but he left the club for Volendam after the season. Menzo was succeeded by Rini Coolen. Coolen was sacked halfway through the 2006–07 season due to the poor results. The season was completed by the two assistant coaches Roberto Klomp and Marco Heering without success: AGOVV finished last in the league table. 

John van den Brom was contracted as head coach for the next three seasons. A 6th place finish in the 2009–10 season was the best result since AGOVV's return to professional football, when the club would play one last time in the promotion play-offs. After the 2009–10 season, Van den Brom moved to ADO Den Haag, notwithstanding his one-year ongoing contract; Hans de Koning succeeded him. Because AGOVV and De Koning could not reach an agreement on a new contract after one season, Hans van Arum came over from Vitesse as the new head coach; his first head coaching job. Van Arum was suspended for "security reasons" for the last game of the following season, 2011–12. AGOVV had only missed the bottom spot in the league because FC Emmen had been deducted six points due to financial irregularities. Andries Ulderink became manager for the 2012–13 season.

Bankruptcy (2012–2013)
There have been plans in the AGOVV organisation to build a new stadium for 6,000 spectators in the southwest gate of Apeldoorn. Another possibility was the buyback by the municipality of Apeldoorn of the existing site that had been sold to AGOVV in 1999, after which the football club would become solely a tenant. In March 2012, it appeared that AGOVV considered the price offered to be too low. There was also the intention to disconnect the professional part of AGOVV from the amateur branch in order to create a new professional football club in sports park Malkenschoten, in which there would be intensive cooperation with amateur football in Apeldoorn, including the independent amateur clubs of AGOVV, Apeldoornse Boys and others.

However, these and other future plans had become highly uncertain due to a debt of €2 million, of which more than €400,000 tax debt. The tax authorities filed for bankruptcy in December 2012. On 11 December 2012, the court gave AGOVV four weeks to submit a rescue plan. In early January 2013, the KNVB disciplinary committee deducted two points from the club in connection with the financial problems. With that, AGOVV dropped from eleventh to fourteenth place in the league table. On 8 January, AGOVV were declared bankrupt in absentia. The professional club AGOVV was officially declared bankrupt on 11 January 2013, when it was announced on behalf of its board that the bankruptcy was resigned, and the team was pulled from the league. Fans held another fundraiser for their club, which was, however, in vain. Only €50,000 was raised.

Due to the bankruptcy of the professional branch, the amateur association also landed in dire financial straits. In February 2013, the tax authorities gave the club two weeks to settle an overdue debt. The amateur branch was saved by external investors. Sportpark Berg & Bos was also retained.

A new beginning (2013–present)
The amateur section of AGOVV continued after bankruptcy. As of the 2013–14 season, AGOVV switched from having a Sunday team to Saturday football. AGOVV started in the Saturday Vierde Klasse B, the ninth tier of Dutch football. After one season in the Vierde Klasse Saturday, AGOVV were immediately promoted to the Saturday Derde Klasse B. In 2016, AGOVV were promoted to the Saturday Tweede Klasse G. The shared youth academy with Vitesse was discontinued, which meant that the club saw a drastic fall in membership in the youth department. Since then, the team have managed to establish several youth teams. In addition, the club houses a KNVB youth center.

Financially, the club also showed improvements. Debts were paid off. The renovation of the wooden stand on the Sportpark Berg & Bos was completed and was reopened on 20 August 2016 by alderman Detlev Cziesso. As of the 2022-23 season, AGOVV played in the Tweede Klasse, the seventh overall tier in the Dutch football league system.

Accommodation

AGOVV has been playing at Sportpark Berg en Bos in the neighbourhood of the same name in the west of Apeldoorn since 1921. The sports park is located in a wooded area. Due to the return of AGOVV to professional football, a football stadium was built at the sports park in 2003. The stadium bears the name Stadion Berg & Bos and has a capacity of 3250 seats. After the bankruptcy of the professional branch, the amateurs continued to play in the stadium.

Honours
 KNVB Beker
 2nd in 1938
 Eerste Klasse Oost
 Winners in 1942 en 1949

Results

Domestic Results
Below is a table with AGOVV's domestic results since the introduction of professional football in 1956.

Vitesse/AGOVV Youth Academy
The Vitesse/AGOVV Voetbalacademie (English: Vitesse/AGOVV Youth Academy) was officially founded in 2005, when the youth academies of AGOVV and Vitesse merged. The newly formed academy received the official regional youth academy status from the KNVB and was based on the structure of the former Vitesse youth academy, with the addition of various AGOVV youth players and staff members. The cooperation between AGOVV and Vitesse was terminated as of July 2013, where the academy continued solely as Vitesse's youth academy.

Players

Notable former players

Famous former managers
  Peter Bosz
  Stanley Menzo
  John van den Brom
  Jurrie Koolhof
  Keith Spurgeon

See also
 Dutch football league teams
 Eerste Divisie

Notes

References

External links
 Official website
 Fansite Blauw Hart

 
Association football clubs established in 1913
1913 establishments in the Netherlands
Football clubs in the Netherlands
Football clubs in Apeldoorn